Krasnodar Higher Military Aviation School of Pilots named after Hero of the Soviet Union A.K. Serov is Russian higher military school conducting commissioned officer programmes (specialitet). It is located in Krasnodar.

History
The School was founded in 1938 in Chita. In 1939, it was relocated in Bataysk and was given the name of Anatoly Serov. Some of its graduates were sent to form the 120th Fighter Aviation Regiment in 1940.

The School was relocated to Krasnodar in 1960. In 1998, it was renamed the Krasnodar military aviation institute. In 2004, it was given its current name.

Educational programmes
The School prepares military pilots for the Air Force.

Alumni
 Bertalan Farkas
 Roman Filipov
 Viktor Gorbatko
 Yevgeny Khrunov
 Vladimir Komarov
 Aleksey Maresyev
 Abdul Ahad Momand
 Phạm Tuân
 Vitaly Popkov
 Georgy Shonin
 Nikolai Skomorokhov
 Nelson Stepanyan

References

External links 
 Official website

Flying training schools of the Soviet Union
Military units and formations established in 1938
Buildings and structures in Krasnodar
Education in Krasnodar Krai